Kerstin Anita Wall (born 11 July 1940), is a Swedish stage and film actress.

She began acting at eleven years of age at Vår teater, a children's theatre, playing Pippi Longstocking and other roles.

From 1958 to 1959 she was employed by Riksteatern and toured with it, before joining the Royal Dramatic Training Academy, where she was one of the last group of students from 1962 to 1965 before its change of name to Statens Scenskola, together with Lars Amble, Börje Ahlstedt, Evabritt Strandberg, Per Ragnar, and others.

Since 1965, Wall has appeared in a wide range of productions at the Royal Dramatic Theatre, including Pinocchio in 1966, The Misanthrope in 1970, Miss Margarida's Way in 1976 (also on TV in 1985), Demons in 1977, Richard III in 1980 and The Servant of Two Masters in 1982. She played the title role in August Strindberg's drama Kristina in 1985. Wall made her film debut in 1959 in Raggare!.

Wall has skillfully alternated between dramatic and humorous roles; many remember her as the maid in the 1978 TV version of the comedy  with Sune Mangs and Bert-Åke Varg. She played the intriguing and elegant businesswoman Elisabeth Lerwacht in the soap opera Rederiet from 1992 to 1994.

In January 2018, Wall was one of the recipients of the Guldbagge Awards for Film of the Year at the 53rd Guldbagge Awards along with Inga Landgré and Lena Söderblom.

She has been married to actor Lars Lind since 2007.

In 2013, she appeared in Crimes of Passion.

Awards 

 2001 – Litteris et Artibus
 2008 – Eugene O'Neill Award
 2008 – The Penguin Award from the Elsa Olenius society for exceptional work in the field of children and youth culture
 2015 – Guldbagge Award for Best Supporting Actress for the role of Frida in the film Hemma

Selected filmography
 Sten Stensson Returns (1963)
 Friends (1988)
 1939 (1989)
 Balls (2010)
 Home (2013)

References

External links

Swedish stage actresses
Swedish film actresses
Actresses from Stockholm
1940 births
Living people
Eugene O'Neill Award winners
Litteris et Artibus recipients
Best Supporting Actress Guldbagge Award winners